Kōji Saitō may refer to:

, Japanese photographer
, Japanese Paralympic athlete